Under Jolly Roger is the third studio album by German heavy metal band Running Wild. It marked a stylistic turning point in which the group dropped the Satanic imagery they had previously used and adopted the pirate theme they would become known for, creating and influencing the later named pirate metal subgenre of heavy metal in the 2000s in the process. The album's title comes from the famous Jolly Roger, the flag used by pirates to identify their ships.

Track listing 
All tracks written by Rolf Kasparek except where noted

The 2017 remastered version contains a second disc, featuring the following songs

Note 
 The CD and Japanese cassette version feature a different track listing.

Personnel 
 Rolf Kasparek – guitars, vocals
 Majk Moti – guitars
 Stephan Boriss – bass
 Hasche – drums

Production
 Dirk Steffens – producer
 Ertuğrul Edirne – artwork
 Rock 'n' Rolf – co-producer

References 

1987 albums
Running Wild (band) albums
Noise Records albums